The Ogaden is one of the major Somali clans.

Overview

Members of the Ogaden clan primarily live in the central Ogaden plateau of Ethiopia (Somali Region), the North Eastern Province of Kenya, and the Jubaland region of Southern Somalia.

According to Human Rights Watch in 2008, the Ogaden is the largest Darod clan in Ethiopia's Somali Region, and may account for 40 to 50 percent of the Somali population in Ethiopia. The Ogaden clan "constitutes the backbone of the ONLF". In particular, the ONLF operates in Ogaden areas.

History

Pre-colonial era
The Ogaden were the principle force behind a series of Somali expansions that led to expulsion of the Wardey clan from west of the Jubba river and displacing Borana in parts of the North Eastern Province in the 19th century. 
Frank Linsly James, one of the first Europeans to travel deep into Ogaden territory while being accompanied by Lord Philips and armed with Martini-Enfield rifles, describes his first encounter with Ogadens in 1884.

After marching for six hours, we were joined by two Ogadayn natives, who said they would show us the wells, which were close at hand. They pointed to our guns and asked their use. When we said, "for killing men and beasts," they laughed, and replied " they would be no use against sticks, let alone swords and spears." A Hornbill was sitting on a tree listening to this conversation, and echoed the natives' laugh with an assenting croak of scorn. Lord Phillips raised his despised firearm, and down fell the lifeless hornbill. Down, too, fell the Ogadayn natives, and remained for some time with their faces pressed against the ground, invoking the protection of the great Allah.

Huwan era
The Huwan era constitutes the period of the Scramble for Africa when the Ogaden area also known as kilinka shanaad or Somali Galbeed was commonly known as the Huwan. 
The easternmost parts of the Huwan had negligible to no influence by emperor Menelik II's or by Zewditu, depending on time period. Somali literature also refers to the territory subjected to Abyssinian expansionism, i.e. the Ogaden, contemporaneously and traditionally as the Huwan:

In the subsequent period, during and after the second World War, the area of the Huwan region began to be referred to as the British Military Administration in Ogaden, or simply British Ogaden in the aftermath of the East African Campaign in 1941.

Groups
ONLF, a sociopolitical movement seeking self-determination
Ragxun, was a minor segment of the 13 Darawiish administrative divisions, and was half Ogaden, half Cali Geri Dhulbahante.
Miinanle, was a major Darawiish administrative divisions, and was one third Ogaden, one third Cali Geri Dhulbahante, one third Odala/ Bahgeri Dhulbahante

Notable persons
Mohammed Abdullah Hassan, the Sayyid, Mad Mullah; leader of the Dervish movement
Mahamoud Mohamed Former Chief of General Staff of the Kenya Defence Forces from 1980 to 1998. 
Admiral Mohammed Omar Osman, Current ONLF chairman
 Aden Abdullahi Nur,, also known as Aadan Gabyow was Somali politician and a military general in the Somali National Army. He served as Minister of Defence under President Siad Barre from 1986 to 1988.
Bashir Bililiqo, Leader of the anti-Barre Somali Patriotic Movement
Asli Hassan Abade, First Somali female pilot
Farah Maalim, Former Deputy Speaker of the National Assembly of Kenya
Aden Duale, The majority leader of the Kenyan parliament
Hassan Abdullah Hersi al-Turki, Islamist leader in Somalia and military leader in the Islamic Courts Union
Mohamed Yusuf Haji, Former Minister of Defence and acting Minister of Internal Security and Provincial Affairs in Kenya
Nuruddin Farah, Renowned writer and winner of the 1998 Neustadt International Prize for Literature
Ahmed Madobe, President of Jubbaland, chairman of the Raskamboni movement
Mohamed Dheere, Fighter in Juba River, and mentor of Ahmed Madoobe.
Hassan Abdillahi, Founder and President of Ogaal Radio
Aden Duale, Current Majority Leader in the Kenyan Parliament
Abdirahman Ali Hassan, Wajir county senator and the deputy minority leader in the senate 2013–2017, assistant minister of trade 2005–2007, Wajir south constituency MP, 2002-2013
Aar Maanta, A Somali-British singer-songwriter, actor, composer, instrumentalist and music producer.
Ahmed Gurey Imam and General of the Adal Sultanate
Kaladi Madlay, Head of part of the Huwan region and highest ranked avowed Ogaden in the Darawiish in the early 1900s
Huseen Dhiqle, Sayid's successor at Iimey and chief memorizer of his poems
Hamed Sultan, An important disciple of the Sayid and teenage ruler of part of the Huwan
Xuseen Dalal Iljeex, Governor of Huwan; ally of emperor Menelik II and opponent of Diiriye Guure

References

 "Collective Punishment: War Crimes and crimes against Humanity in the Ogaden area of Ethiopia's Somali Regional State" (pdf), Human Rights Watch Report (2008)

Ogaden (clan)
Somali clans in Ethiopia
Ogaden